Shadow dance may refer to:

 Shadow dancing, a variation of the country/western two-step
"Shadow Dance", an episode of the animated series X-Men: Evolution
Shadow Dance (novel), a novel by Angela Carter